is a 1987 Japanese original video animation. Directed by Toshiki Hirano, with screenplay by Shō Aikawa, mechanical design by Koichi Ohata and animation direction by Masami Ōbari. The plot is that of Takuya who visits a research center to meet an old friend, and their mutual connection with an experiment three years ago.

Plot

Takuya and Haruka are manning a submersible during an experiment on a new laser weapon. After firing the laser from a satellite, a stranger creature appears. They are ordered to take a sample. Three years later, Takuya gets a letter from Haruka to visit him at a research center. Haruka says that nothing is wrong and that he sent no letter. Rui, a girl who works at the center says that Haruka has been acting very strange lately, and isolates himself in the lab for weeks. Later, a radar center is completely destroyed by another mysterious creature.

Takuya, attempts to figure out the mystery. He breaks into the director's lab with the help of a friend and examines files relating to Haruka's research. In the files, Haruka discusses how the laser likely opens a portal to another dimension. The military then storms the base and takes it over. Haruka calls Takuya to meet him. There he explains that he created a dimensional transfer canon, which summoned another demonic creature, which fused with the canon. Soldiers then arrive to arrest Haruka, but Haruka fuses with the giant demonic creature named Ika Oni. He then destroys most of the research center. During the escape, Rui is killed.

In an attempt to control the situation, the center's director orders the military to fire the laser canon on the island. It fails to destroy the creature. Takuya then pilots another giant demonic creature from the ocean named Hagane and does battle with Haruka's creature. He destroys Haruka's creature. The force of its destruction destroys most of the island. The OVA ends with Takuya awakening on debris floating in water.

Voice actors 
 Toshio Furukawa - Takuya Gozoru
 Kazuhiko Inoue - Haruka Affodo
Sakiko Tamagawa - Rui

Release
it was released by AIC in Japan on December 10, 1987.

References

External links
 

1987 anime OVAs
Anime International Company